The Moroccan three-toed skink (Chalcides pseudostriatus) is a species of skink in the family Scincidae. It is found in Morocco and Spain. Its natural habitats are Mediterranean-type shrubby vegetation, temperate grassland, and rural gardens. It is threatened by habitat loss.

References

Chalcides
Reptiles described in 1993
Taxa named by Vincenzo Caputo
Taxonomy articles created by Polbot